Events from the year 1186 in Ireland.

Incumbent
Lord: John

Events
 Stephen Ridell appointed as first Lord Chancellor of Ireland.
Hugh de Lacy the Elder, 1st Lord of Meath, is assassinated.
Ruaidrí Ua Conchobair is usurped as King of Connacht by his son Conchobar Maenmaige Ua Conchobair.
Approximate date of the construction of Ardfinnan Castle

Births

Deaths
 25 July – Hugh de Lacy, Lord of Meath, 4th Baron Lacy

References